Framlingham railway station was located in Framlingham, Suffolk, UK and was the terminus station on the Framlingham Branch.

It opened on 1 June 1859 and closed to passengers in 1952, and to freight in 1965. The first company to operate trains to the station was the Eastern Counties Railway, which had taken over from the East Suffolk Railway Company that built the branch line.

Regular passenger services were withdrawn in November 1952. Subsequently occasional special passenger trains used the line until the goods train services were withdrawn on 19 April 1965. 1963 

The station dealt with significant goods traffic until the 1950s and also had a small single tracked engine shed where the branch engine was kept overnight. This was a sub shed belonging to the Ipswich Locomotive District and on 1 January 1922 GER Class C32 (later LNER F3) 2-4-2T no 1066 was allocated there.

References

External links
 Framlingham station on navigable 1946 O. S. map

Former Great Eastern Railway stations
Railway stations in Great Britain opened in 1859
Railway stations in Great Britain closed in 1952
Disused railway stations in Suffolk
Railway depots in England